Dhiego Lima (born January 31, 1989) is a Brazilian retired mixed martial artist who competed in the welterweight division of the UFC.

Mixed martial arts career 
Lima was born and spent his early childhood in the Brazilian city of Goiânia and began training in mixed martial arts as a teenager.  He moved to the United States with his brother, settling in Atlanta, Georgia.  Lima made his professional debut in 2010 competing for regional promotions across North America, including a five fight stint with Maximum Fighting Championship.  He compiled a record of 9 - 1, before auditioning for The Ultimate Fighter.

The Ultimate Fighter
In December 2013, it was announced that Lima would a cast member on The Ultimate Fighter 19, representing Team Edgar at middleweight.  Over the course of the show, Lima first defeated Tim Williams in the quarterfinals via submission (rear-naked choke).  In the semifinals, Lima went on to defeat Roger Zapata via submission (armbar) to reach the finals.

Ultimate Fighting Championship 
Lima made his official UFC debut facing fellow castmate and Team Edgar teammate Eddie Gordon in the middleweight finals on July 6, 2014 The Ultimate Fighter 19 Finale. Lima lost the fight via knockout in the first round.  Subsequently, Lima was awarded both Performance of the Season bonuses for his submission finishes during the season.

Lima was expected to face Pawel Pawlak in a welterweight bout on November 8, 2014, at UFC Fight Night 56.  However, Pawlak was forced to pull out of the fight due to injury and replaced by Jorge de Oliveira.  Lima won the fight via unanimous decision.

Lima faced Tim Means on February 28, 2015, at UFC 184.  Means won the fight via first-round TKO.

Lima filled in as a short notice replacement against Li Jingliang on May 16, 2015, at UFC Fight Night 66, replacing Roger Zapata. He lost the fight by knockout in the first round.

On July 5, 2015, Lima confirmed his release from the UFC.

The Ultimate Fighter: Redemption
In February 2017, it was revealed that Lima would compete again on the UFC's reality show in the 25th season on The Ultimate Fighter: Redemption. Lima was the fourth pick overall for Team Dillashaw. He faced Hayder Hassan in the opening round and won by unanimous decision.  He faced Gilbert Smith in the quarter finals, winning the bout in a third round sudden death victory. Smith announced his retirement after the loss to Lima. In the semi-finals, Lima faced teammate Tom Gallicchio and won by unanimous decision to be the first fighter in the finals.

UFC return
Three years after his first stint on the show, Lima faced teammate Jesse Taylor in the finals on July 7, 2017, at The Ulimate Fighter: Redemption Finale. He lost the back-and-forth fight via rear-naked choke submission in the second round.

Lima faced Yushin Okami on April 14, 2018, at UFC on Fox 29. He lost the fight via unanimous decision.

Lima faced Chad Laprise on December 8, 2018, at UFC 231. He won the fight by knockout in the first round.

As the last fight of his The Ultimate Fighter contract, Lima faced Court McGee on April 27, 2019, at UFC Fight Night: Jacaré vs. Hermansson. He won the fight via split decision.

After the McGee fight, Lima signed a new contract with the UFC and faced Luke Jumeau on October 6, 2019, at UFC 243. He won the fight via split decision. Despite the win, Lima's manager revealed that they are going to appeal the split decision to be turned to unanimous.

Lima was scheduled to face Alex Morono on February 8, 2020, at UFC 247. However, on January 22, 2020, Lima was forced to withdraw from the bout due to a neck injury.

Lima was scheduled to face Belal Muhammad, replacing Sean Brady on December 19, 2020, at UFC Fight Night 183. However, Muhammed was diagnosed with COVID-19 during the week leading up to the event and the bout was scrapped from the card, and the bout was rescheduled to February 13, 2021, at UFC 258 Lima lost the fight via unanimous decision.

Lima faced Matt Brown on June 19, 2021, at UFC on ESPN 25. He lost the fight by knockout in the second round.

In February 2022, Lima announced his retirement from competition in MMA.

Personal life
Dhiego Lima is the younger brother of the former Bellator Welterweight champion Douglas Lima.  He is also owner, along with his brother Douglas Lima, of American Top Team - Team Lima in Lawrenceville, Georgia.

Championships and accomplishments
Ultimate Fighting Championship
The Ultimate Fighter 19 - Performance of the Season (Lima was awarded both Performance bonuses)
Runner up on The Ultimate Fighter 19
Runner up on The Ultimate Fighter: Redemption 
Titan Fighting Championship
Titan FC Welterweight Championship (One Time)

Mixed martial arts record

|-
|Loss
|align=center|15–9
|Matt Brown
|KO (punch)
|UFC on ESPN: The Korean Zombie vs. Ige
|
|align=center|2
|align=center|3:02
|Las Vegas, Nevada, United States
|
|-
|Loss
|align=center|15–8
|Belal Muhammad
|Decision (unanimous)
|UFC 258 
|
|align=center|3
|align=center|5:00
|Las Vegas, Nevada, United States
|
|-
|Win
|align=center|15–7
|Luke Jumeau
|Decision (split)
|UFC 243 
|
|align=center|3
|align=center|5:00
|Melbourne, Australia
|
|-
|Win
|align=center|14–7
|Court McGee
|Decision (split)
|UFC Fight Night: Jacaré vs. Hermansson 
|
|align=center|3
|align=center|5:00
|Sunrise, Florida, United States
|
|-
|Win
|align=center|13–7
|Chad Laprise
|KO (punch)
|UFC 231 
|
|align=center|1
|align=center|1:37
|Toronto, Ontario, Canada
|
|- 
|Loss
|align=center|12–7
|Yushin Okami
|Decision (unanimous)
|UFC on Fox: Poirier vs. Gaethje
|
|align=center|3
|align=center|5:00
|Glendale, Arizona, United States
|
|- 
|Loss
|align=center|12–6
|Jesse Taylor
|Submission (rear-naked choke)
|The Ultimate Fighter: Redemption Finale 
|
|align=center|2
|align=center|0:43
|Las Vegas, Nevada, United States
|
|-
| Loss
| align=center| 12–5
| Jason Jackson
| TKO (punches)
| Titan FC 42
| 
| align=center| 1
| align=center| 2:10
| Coral Gables, Florida, United States
| 
|-
| Win
| align=center| 12–4
| David Michaud
| Decision (unanimous)
| Titan FC 39
| 
| align=center| 5
| align=center| 5:00
| Coral Gables, Florida, United States
| 
|-
|-
| Win
| align=center| 11–4
| Antonio Trócoli
| Decision (unanimous)
| Legacy FC 53
| 
| align=center| 3
| align=center| 5:00
| Atlanta, Georgia, United States
| 
|-
| Loss
| align=center| 10–4
| Li Jingliang
| KO (punches)
| UFC Fight Night: Edgar vs. Faber
| 
| align=center| 1
| align=center| 1:25
| Pasay, Philippines
| 
|-
| Loss
| align=center| 10–3
| Tim Means
| TKO (punches)
| UFC 184
| 
| align=center| 1
| align=center| 2:17
| Los Angeles, California, United States
| 
|-
| Win
| align=center| 10–2
| Jorge de Oliveira
| Decision (unanimous)
| UFC Fight Night: Shogun vs. Saint Preux
| 
| align=center| 3
| align=center| 5:00
| Uberlândia, Brazil
| 
|-
| Loss
| align=center| 9–2
| Eddie Gordon
| KO (punches) 
| The Ultimate Fighter: Team Edgar vs. Team Penn Finale
| 
| align=center| 1
| align=center| 1:11
| Las Vegas, Nevada, United States
| 
|-
| Win
| align=center| 9–1
| Ricky Rainey
| Decision (split)
| XFC 25: Boiling Point
| 
| align=center| 3
| align=center| 5:00
| Albuquerque, New Mexico, United States
| 
|-
| Win
| align=center| 8–1
| Roger Carroll
| TKO (punches)
| Wild Bill's Fight Night 53
| 
| align=center| 3
| align=center| 3:06
| Duluth, Georgia, United States
| 
|-
| Win
| align=center| 7–1
| Nick Hinchliffe
| Decision (unanimous)
| MFC 34
| 
| align=center| 3
| align=center| 5:00
| Edmonton, Alberta, Canada
| 
|-
| Loss
| align=center| 6–1
| Nathan Coy
| Decision (unanimous)
| MFC 32
| 
| align=center| 3
| align=center| 5:00
| Edmonton, Alberta, Canada
| 
|-
| Win
| align=center| 6–0
| Jamie Toney
| KO (punches)
| MFC 30: Up Close & Personal
| 
| align=center| 1
| align=center| 2:47
| Edmonton, Alberta, Canada
| 
|-
| Win
| align=center| 5–0
| Josh Taveirne
| Submission (rear-naked choke)
| MFC 29: Conquer
| 
| align=center| 3
| align=center| 3:35
| Windsor, Ontario, Canada
| 
|-
| Win
| align=center| 4–0
| Bill Fraser
| KO (punch)
| MFC 27
| 
| align=center| 2
| align=center| 2:36
| Enoch, Alberta, Canada
|
|-
| Win
| align=center| 3–0
| Keon Caldwell
| Submission (armbar)
| Sportfight X - 3
| 
| align=center| 1
| align=center| 4:44
| Atlanta, Georgia, United States
| 
|-
| Win
| align=center| 2–0
| Kenny Moss
| Submission (triangle choke)
| Sportfight X - 1
| 
| align=center| 1
| align=center| 4:28
| Atlanta, Georgia, United States
| 
|-
| Win
| align=center| 1–0
| Steve Montgomery
| Submission (triangle choke)
| Fight Party
| 
| align=center| 3
| align=center| 4:41
| Greenville, South Carolina, United States
|

Mixed martial arts exhibition record

|-
|Win
|align=center|6–0
|Tom Gallicchio
|Decision (unanimous)
|rowspan=3|The Ultimate Fighter: Redemption
| (airdate)
|align=center|3
|align=center|5:00
|rowspan=3|Las Vegas, Nevada, United States
|
|-
|Win
|align=center|5–0
|Gilbert Smith
|Decision (unanimous)
| (airdate)
|align=center|3
|align=center|5:00
|
|-
|Win
|align=center|4–0
|Hayder Hassan
|Decision (unanimous)
| (airdate)
|align=center|2
|align=center|5:00
|
|-
|Win
|align=center|3–0
|Roger Zapata
|Submission (armbar)
|rowspan=3|The Ultimate Fighter 19
| (airdate)
|align=center|1
|align=center|0:34
|rowspan=3|Las Vegas, Nevada, United States
|
|-
|win
|align=center|2–0
|Tim Williams
|Submission (rear-naked choke)
| (airdate)
|align=center|2
|align=center|3:36
|
|-
|Win
|align=center|1–0
|Adam Stroup
|Decision (unanimous)
| (airdate)
|align=center|2
|align=center|5:00
|

See also

 List of male mixed martial artists

References

External links

Brazilian expatriate sportspeople in the United States
Brazilian male mixed martial artists
Welterweight mixed martial artists
Mixed martial artists utilizing Brazilian jiu-jitsu
Sportspeople from Goiânia
Living people
1989 births
Ultimate Fighting Championship male fighters
Brazilian practitioners of Brazilian jiu-jitsu